The Ambassador of Australia to Jordan is an officer of the Australian Department of Foreign Affairs and Trade and the head of the Embassy of the Commonwealth of Australia to the Hashemite Kingdom of Jordan. The Ambassador resides in Amman.

Australia’s diplomatic relations with Jordan began when Pierre Hutton, then Ambassador to Lebanon, was accredited as non-resident Ambassador to Jordan on 29 April 1975. A Jordan post was opened in Amman in 1979 with David Wadham named as Chargé d'Affaires while the then non-resident Ambassador, H.N. Truscott, remained in Lebanon. The first resident Ambassador was appointed in 1982, a move in part to ensure that Australia could be more fully informed about developments in the Middle East.

The current Ambassador to Jordan, since January 2021, is Bernard Lynch.

List of ambassadors

References

Jordan
Australia